Dimitris Metaxas is a distinguished professor and the chair of the Computer Science Department at Rutgers University, where he directs the Center for Computational Biomedicine Imaging and Modeling (CBIM).

Education

Metaxas was educated at the University of Toronto where he was awarded a PhD degree in 1992 under the supervision of Demetri Terzopoulos as part of the Dynamic Graphics Project. He was awarded an M.Sc. in Computer Science from the University of Maryland, College Park in 1988. He did his undergraduate studies in Electrical and Computer Engineering at the National Technical University of Athens.

Career
Metaxas became an assistant professor in the Computer and Information Science Department at the University of Pennsylvania and director of the VAST Lab. From January 1998 to September 2001 he was a tenured associate professor in the same department. In September 2001, he moved to Rutgers as a professor in the Department of Computer Science at Rutgers University. Since July 2007, Metaxas is a professor II (distinguished professor) and since 2013, he is the chair of the same department. Since 2001, he has founded and has been directing the Center for Computational Biomedicine, Imaging and Modeling (CBIM).

Research
Metaxas has developed formal methods upon which computer vision, computer graphics and medical image computing have advanced synergistically. In computer vision, his work pioneered the simultaneous segmentation and fitting of complex objects, statistical model-based tracking, shape representation, learning, sparsity, ASL as well as gesture recognition. In particular, Metaxas is focusing on human body and shape motion analysis, human surveillance, security applications, ASL recognition, behavior modeling and analysis and scalable solutions to large and distributed sensor-based networks. In the area of biomedical applications, Metaxas has developed new methods for material modeling and shape estimation of internal body parts (such as the lungs) using data from MRI, SPAMM and CT scan. He has pioneered the linking of the anatomical and physiological models of the human body and deformable models used for the automatic diagnosis of heart disease from MRI data. In computer graphics, Metaxas introduced the Navier-Stokes methodology for Fluids, based on which the water scenes in the movie Antz were created in 1998. For this work, his student Nick Foster won a Technical Achievement award from the Academy of Motion Picture Arts and Sciences in 1999. Since then, Metaxas is working on new techniques for modeling fluid phenomena, and control theoretic techniques for automating and improving the animation of articulated (e.g., humans) objects. Metaxas has published over 350 research articles. He has more than 20,000 citations.

Awards and honors
Metaxas's research has been awarded by the major Government agencies including the NSF, NIH, NASA, ONR, AFOSR and the ARO. He has received several patents and best paper awards for his work. Metaxas was awarded a Fulbright Fellowship in 1986, is a recipient of an NSF Research Initiation and Career awards, an ONR YIP, a Fellow of the American Institute for Medical and Biological Engineering, a Fellow of the IEEE, and a member of the ACM. He has served as the Program Chair of ICCV 2007, the General Chair of ICCV 2011, the General Chair of MICCAI 2008  and the Senior Program Chair for SCA 2007.

References

Living people
Computer graphics researchers
Computer graphics professionals
Computer vision researchers
Rutgers University faculty
American computer scientists
Greek computer scientists
Year of birth missing (living people)
Fellows of the American Institute for Medical and Biological Engineering
Fellow Members of the IEEE